In mathematics, the Jacobi method for complex Hermitian matrices is a generalization of the Jacobi iteration method.

Derivation 
The complex unitary rotation matrices Rpq can be used for Jacobi iteration of complex Hermitian matrices in order to find a numerical estimation of their eigenvectors and eigenvalues simultaneously.

Similar to the Givens rotation matrices, Rpq are defined as:

Each rotation matrix, Rpq, will modify only the pth and qth rows or columns of a matrix M if it is applied from left or right, respectively:

A Hermitian matrix, H is defined by the conjugate transpose symmetry property:

By definition, the complex conjugate of a complex unitary rotation matrix, R is its inverse and also a complex  unitary rotation matrix:

Hence, the complex equivalent Givens transformation  of a Hermitian matrix H is also a Hermitian matrix similar to H:

The elements of T can be calculated by the relations above. The important elements for the Jacobi iteration are the following four:

Each Jacobi iteration with RJpq generates a transformed matrix, TJ, with TJp,q = 0.  The rotation matrix RJp,q is defined as a product of two complex unitary rotation matrices.

Finally, it is important to note that the product of two complex rotation matrices for given angles θ1 and θ2 cannot be transformed into a single complex unitary rotation matrix Rpq(θ). The product of two complex rotation matrices are given by:

References 

 .

Numerical linear algebra